Pelsaert Island is one of the islands of the Pelsaert Group, which is the southernmost of the three groups of islands that make up the Houtman Abrolhos island chain in Western Australia.

The group and island is named by the captain of HMS Beagle, which was charting the area, after the  commodore Francisco Pelsaert of the Dutch East India Company trading fleet whose ship, the "Batavia" got wreched at sank at the Wallabi island group to the north. The captain saw a wreck on the island, mistakenly assumed it was the Batavia and named it after Pelsaert.

The island is a significant bird site.

The island and group contains the most southerly true coral reefs in the Indian Ocean.

See also
 Wallabi Group
 Easter Group
 List of islands of Western Australia

References